Myrosmodes is a genus of flowering plants from the orchid family, Orchidaceae, native to South America.

Species:
Myrosmodes breve (Schltr.) Garay
Myrosmodes chiogena (Schltr.) C.A.Vargas
Myrosmodes cleefii Szlach., Mytnik & S.Nowak, 2012
Myrosmodes cochleare Garay
Myrosmodes filamentosum (Mansf.) Garay
Myrosmodes gymnandra (Rchb.f.) C.A.Vargas
Myrosmodes inaequalis (Rchb.f.) C.A.Vargas
 Myrosmodes nervosa (Kraenzl.) Novoa, C.A. Vargas & Cisternas, 2015; synonyms: Aa nervosa (Kraenzl.) Schltr., 1912; Altensteinia nervosa Kraenzl., 1905 
Myrosmodes nubigenum Rchb.f.
Myrosmodes paludosa (Rchb.f.) P.Ortiz
Myrosmodes reticulata Szlach., Mytnik & S.Nowak, 2012 
Myrosmodes rhynchocarpum (Schltr.) Garay
Myrosmodes rostratum (Rchb.f.) Garay
Myrosmodes subnivalis Szlach., Mytnik & S.Nowak, 2012 
Myrosmodes ustulatum (Schltr.) Garay
Myrosmodes weberbaueri (Schltr.) C.A.Vargas

References

 Pridgeon, A.M., Cribb, P.J., Chase, M.A. & Rasmussen, F. eds. (1999). Genera Orchidacearum 1. Oxford Univ. Press.
 Pridgeon, A.M., Cribb, P.J., Chase, M.A. & Rasmussen, F. eds. (2001). Genera Orchidacearum 2. Oxford Univ. Press.
 Pridgeon, A.M., Cribb, P.J., Chase, M.A. & Rasmussen, F. eds. (2003). Genera Orchidacearum 3. Oxford Univ. Press
 Berg Pana, H. 2005. Handbuch der Orchideen-Namen. Dictionary of Orchid Names. Dizionario dei nomi delle orchidee. Ulmer, Stuttgart

External links 

Orchids of South America
Cranichideae genera
Cranichidinae